The Northeast Home Heating Oil Reserve was created in July 2000 to provide a reserve of heating oil for the approximately 5.3 million households in the Northeast region of the United States that use heating oil for their homes.

History
On July 10, 2000, President of the United States Bill Clinton directed Energy Secretary Bill Richardson to establish a  home heating oil component of the Strategic Petroleum Reserve in the Northeast. The intent was to create a buffer large enough to allow commercial companies to compensate for interruptions in supply or severe winter weather, but not so large as to dissuade suppliers from responding to increasing prices as a sign that more supply is needed.

The reserve was opened for the first time in November 2012.  were made available to local and Federal agencies for relief efforts in the wake of Hurricane Sandy.

Facilities
Amerada Hess Corp., Perth Amboy (near Woodbridge, New Jersey). Capacity 965,000 barrels
Amerada Hess Corp., Groton, Connecticut.  Capacity 250,000 barrels
Morgan Stanley, New Haven, Connecticut.  Capacity 750,000 barrels

See also

Energy security
Strategic reserve

References

Petroleum in the United States
Energy policy of the United States
United States Department of Energy facilities
Strategic reserves of the United States
Heating oil